John Kessler (December 14, 1847 – June 12, 1917) was an American businessman and politician.

Born in Bavaria, Germany, Kessler emigrated with his parents to the United States, in 1855, and settled in Milwaukee, Wisconsin, Kessler was a cigar maker. He also lived in Green Bay, La Crosse, Oconomowoc, Kenosha, Wisconsin, Chicago, Wisconsin, and Council Bluffs, Iowa. In 1868, Kessler settled in Watertown, Wisconsin. He served as the Watertown City Treasurer. Kessler also served on the Watertown Common Council from 1895 to 1897 and was a Democrat. In 1899, Kessler served in the Wisconsin State Assembly. Kessler died at his home in Watertown, Wisconsin.

Notes

1847 births
1917 deaths
Bavarian emigrants to the United States
Politicians from Watertown, Wisconsin
Cigar makers
Businesspeople from Wisconsin
Wisconsin city council members
19th-century American politicians
19th-century American businesspeople
Democratic Party members of the Wisconsin State Assembly